"When I Grow Up" is a song by American rapper NF, released on June 27, 2019 as the third single from his fourth studio album The Search. Written and produced by NF and Tommee Profitt, it peaked at number 78 on the Billboard Hot 100.

Composition 
On the track NF narrates from his perspective when he was a child. He recounts his childhood dream of becoming a professional rapper, and his strong determination to pursue his career despite the extreme difficulty to do so and how the events in his life turn out.

Music video 
The music video was directed by NF and Patrick Tohill. It begins with several kids, including a young NF, saying what they want to be when they grow up. NF says that he is going to be a rapper. The scene then shifts to his back-to-back jobs working as a garbage disposal man, a janitor, and working at a fast food restaurant, until finally he follows his dream.

Charts

Certifications

References 

2019 songs
2019 singles
NF (rapper) songs
Songs written by NF (rapper)
Songs written by Tommee Profitt
Caroline Records singles